The 2017 iHeartRadio Much Music Video Awards (or simply the iHeartRadio MMVAs) were held on June 18, 2017, outside 299 Queen Street West in Toronto, Canada. It was hosted by Joe Jonas and Alessia Cara. Initial announcements were made on April 26, 2017. This is the final ceremony to be held in June and on Father's Day.

Highlights of the broadcast included a red carpet ceremony where Marianas Trench marked their 10th and final year at the MMVAs by arriving covered in dozens of colourful balloons. Lead singer Josh Ramsay emerged from a cardboard cake dressed in a faux whip cream bikini.

During the opening monologue Joe Jonas, who hosted the show eight years earlier with the Jonas Brothers, referenced the pending legalization of marijuana in Canada saying, "This time next year it will be completely legal for Canadians to be blem for real,'' referring to the Drake song "Blem" which uses slang for getting high.

The broadcast also had recurring themes of diversity and acceptance brought up by numerous presenters and winners. When indigenous group A Tribe Called Red won video of the year for "R.E.D.'' guest rapper Narcy spoke out about representation. He told the crowd,

Performances

Presenters

 KJ Apa
 Nikki Bella
 Lilly Singh (IISuperwomanII)
 Brandon Flynn
 Hedley
 Shay Mitchell
 Bea Miller
 Martha Hunt
 4YallEntertainment
 Keke Palmer
 Shenae Grimes-Beech
 Serena Ryder
 Jus Reign
 Tyler Oakley
 Dove Cameron
 Tatiana Maslany
 Tyler Shaw
 Shawn Hook
 Scott Helman
 Massari
 Torrance Coombs
 Kat Graham
 David Mazouz
 Lights
 Carly Rae Jepsen

Winners & nominees
Wildcard nominees were announced on May 3, 2017. The full list of nominees was published on May 18, 2017.

Video of the Year
A Tribe Called Red (featuring Yasiin Bey, Narcy & Black Bear) — "R.E.D."
 Kaytranada (featuring Anderson .Paak) — "Glowed Up"
 Pup — "Sleep in the Heat"
 Shawn Mendes — "Mercy"
 Coleman Hell — "Fireproof"

Best Post-Production
Sleepy Tom (featuring Tonye) — "Seeing Double" (Post-production: Matt Bilewicz, Zhargal Sambuev, Farah Yusuf, Sean Evans, Ryan Ruskay & Fezz Stenton)
 Darcys — "Miracle" (Post-production: Common Good)
 Somewhere Else (featuring Majid Jordan) — "Move Together" (Post-production: Helmi)
 Zeds Dead (featuring Rivers Cuomo & Pusha T) — "Too Young" (Post-production: James Wright, Tine Kluth & Chris Ullens)
 Cœur de pirate — "Undone" (Post-production: Alain Loiselle, Jérôme Cloutier, Bruno de Coninck Julien Delorme, Andrew Ludovico, Lucy Rybicka & Josh Sherrett)

Best EDM/Dance Video
Grimes (featuring Janelle Monáe) — "Venus Fly"
 MSTRKRFT — "Runaway"
 Grandtheft (featuring Delaney Jane) — "Easy Go"
 DJ Shub (featuring Northern Cree Singers) — "Indomitable"
 A Tribe Called Red (featuring Yasiin Bey, Narcy & Black Bear) — "R.E.D."

Best Director
A Tribe Called Red (featuring Black Bear) — "Stadium Pow Wow" (Director: Kevan Funk)
 Zeds Dead (featuring Twin Shadow) — "Stardust" (Director: Adam Beck)
 Wintersleep — "Spirit" (Director: Michael LeBlanc)
 Grimes (featuring Janelle Monáe) — "Venus Fly" (Director: Claire Boucher)
 CRi (featuring Ouri) — "Rush" (Director: Didier Charette)

Best Pop Video
Shawn Mendes — "Mercy"
 SonReal — "No Warm Up"
 Coleman Hell — "Fireproof"
 Hedley — "Can't Slow Down"
 Grimes (featuring Janelle Monáe) — "Venus Fly"

Best Rock/Alternative Video
The Tragically Hip — "In a World Possessed by the Human Mind"
 Pup — "Sleep in the Heat"
 Wintersleep — "Spirit"
 July Talk feat. Tanya Tagaq — "Beck + Call"
 Arkells — "Knocking at the Door"

Best Hip Hop Video
Tasha the Amazon — "Picasso Leaning"
 TassNata (featuring Rich Kidd & Tona) — "Let's Go"
 Sean Leon — "81"
 Jazz Cartier — "Red Alert / 100 Roses"
 Derek Wise — "Disconnected"

Best MuchFACT Video
River Tiber — "Acid Test"
 Pup — "Sleep in the Heat"
 Majid Jordan — "Small Talk"
 CRi (featuring Ouri) — "Rush"
 dvsn — "With Me / Do It Well"

iHeartRadio International Artist of the Year
Lorde
 Katy Perry
 Kendrick Lamar
 Ed Sheeran
 Future

Most Buzzworthy International Artist or Group
Ed Sheeran
 Kendrick Lamar
 Lady Gaga
 Lorde
 Iggy Azalea

Most Buzzworthy Canadian Artist
Drake
 Justin Bieber
 Shawn Mendes
 The Weeknd
 Alessia Cara

iHeartRadio International Duo or Group of the Year
Imagine Dragons
 Migos
 The Chainsmokers
 Twenty One Pilots
 DNCE

Best New Canadian Artist
PARTYNEXTDOOR
 Jessie Reyez
 Charlotte Day Wilson
 Daniel Caesar
 dvsn

iHeartRadio Canadian Single of the Year
Drake (featuring Wizkid & Kyla) — "One Dance"
 The Weeknd (featuring Daft Punk) — "Starboy"
 Alessia Cara — "Scars to Your Beautiful"

Best New International Artist
Camila Cabello
 Lil Yachty
 Niall Horan
 Post Malone
 Chance the Rapper

Fan Fave Video
Arkells — "Knocking at the Door"
 Zeds Dead (featuring Rivers Cuomo & Pusha T) — "Too Young"
 A Tribe Called Red (featuring Yasiin Bey, Narcy & Black Bear) — "R.E.D."
 Jessie Reyez — "Shutter Island"
 Grimes (featuring Janelle Monáe) — "Venus Fly"

Fan Fave Artist or Group
Justin Bieber
 The Weeknd
 Drake
 Shawn Mendes
 Alessia Cara

Fan Fave International Artist or Group
Niall Horan
 Ed Sheeran
 Katy Perry
 Lorde
 Beyoncé

Fan Fave Much Creator
YouTwoTV
 AmandaRachLee
 Jaclyn Forbes
 Candace Leca
 Mike on Much

References

MuchMusic Video Awards
Much Music
2017 in Canadian music
2017 in Canadian television